Lo Fidelity Allstars are an English electronic music group who have recorded since the late 1990s.

Career
Their members originate from various cities in Northern England. They were formed in Leeds before relocating first to London, where they came to the attention of major record labels. After signing to Skint Records the band relocated to Brighton on the south coast, where that label is based. Subsequent to parting company with Skint, the band liquidated their Brighton studio complex 'The Brainfarm', and the personnel are now based variously in Brighton, The Midlands and New York.

Their earlier work is noted for genre-crossing stylings, distorted, morose, and at times alien lyrics, distinctive funk bass lines, and extensive use of lo-fi recording practices. This work is best exemplified by their 1998 debut album How to Operate with a Blown Mind on Skint Records. At this time, the Lo Fidelity Allstars were credited by pseudonyms rather than their actual names. After its release, the band's lead vocalist David Randall (credited as The Wrekked Train) left, shortly followed by the keyboard player "Sheriff" John Stone. For their second studio album, Don't Be Afraid of Love, the members of the band discarded their pseudonyms in favor of using their real names.

Before the split, they recorded a mix album On the Floor at the Boutique (a follow-up to Fatboy Slim's mix album of the same name) containing an eclectic selection of tracks, including two short tracks recorded by the original line-up especially for the mix: "You're Never Alone With A Clone," and "Bootsy Call". Another track, "Many Tentacles Pimping on the Keys," was also included which was released previously as "Disco Machine Gun Part 2" on the "Disco Machine Gun" EP in September 1997.

The 2002 album Don't Be Afraid of Love included a number of guest vocalists, including funk luminary Bootsy Collins.

2007 saw the release on Skint Records of the double CD Warming Up the Brain Farm: The Best of, a compilation featuring tracks from the first two albums along with rare and unreleased tracks.

The group's third studio album Northern Stomp was released on 27 July 2009, on Corsair Records, preceded by the single "Smash & Grab World" which was released worldwide in April, and was the band's first new material for four years.

Northern Stomp was widely well received, with DJ Magazine giving 4 stars, saying "This is a blown band album dripping with (northern) soul. The Lo-Fis are back and they deserve adoration all over again" and the world's best selling music monthly Q, calling it "a dance-tinged hybrid that becomes more fascinating with each listen".

The second single taken from the album was "Your Midnight" which featured remixes from Phil Ward's alter ego Lord Warddd, and label mate IDC, and was released on 31 August 2009.

Solo work and individual projects
When Randall and Stone left they briefly set up as a new group called The Big Heat, while also recording a live mix for BBC Radio 1's Mary Anne Hobbs show. Randall contributed guest vocals to "The Snow Falls" from The Baldwin Brothers' album The Return of the Golden Rhodes credited as 'The Train' and "Rest Easy" from Half's debut album Here Lies credited as 'Wrecked Train'.
In the gap between work on the second and third albums, the Lo Fidelity Allstars took on another set of pseudonyms to perform live as the group Technically Men. A ten-track album of the same name received a limited release.

In 2008, Ward launched a solo project as Lord Ward, releasing the singles "Brooklyn Blister" and "Rich Boys in Strip Clubs" on Corsair Records. In 2009 he added some extra d's to become Lord Warddd, and released several remixes for artists including Matt and Kim, Cubic Zirconia and Hollywood Undead. He continues to play DJ sets around the world under both the Lo Fidelity Allstars and Lord Warddd banners.

Martin is one half of 2K Subs.

Members
 Phil Ward (aka The Albino Priest) - vocals, keyboards, programming, production, decks (1996-present)
 Andy Dickinson (aka A One Man Crowd Called Gentile) - vocals, bass (1996-present)
 Martin Whiteman (aka Many Tentacles) - vocals, co-production, engineering, mixing (1996-present)
 Del Vegas - guitars (2002-present)
 Johnny Machin (aka The Slammer) - drums (1996-present)
 Dale Maloney (aka Pele) - keyboards (1998 - present)

Former members
 Dave Randall (aka The Wrekked Train) - vocals (1996-1999)
 John Stone (aka Sheriff Jon Stone) - keyboards, programming (1996-1999)

Discography

Albums

EPs
Ghostmutt (2000) #8 UK Budget Albums Chart

Singles

Compilation album

References

External links
 Lo Fidelity Allstars at Myspace

English electronic music groups
Musical groups from London
Musical groups established in 1996
Columbia Records artists